Michela Maltese (born 20 April 1995) is an Italian professional racing cyclist.

Career results
2016
2nd  Team Pursuit, UEC European U23 Track Championships (with Martina Alzini, Claudia Cretti and Francesca Pattaro)

See also
 2014 Astana BePink Women's Team season

References

External links
 

1995 births
Living people
Italian female cyclists
Cyclists from Brescia